The festival of San Prudencio, in the city of Vitoria-Gasteiz, Álava, Spain, is held around the saint's feast day (28 April). Due to its popularity, the city organizes a number of activities. The festival begins on 27 April in Plaza de la Diputación, where a stage is prepared for the traditional Basque dance groups.

San Prudencio

Patron saint

San Prudencio, the patron saint of Álava, was an anchorite and priest who became bishop of Tarazona. He was named the patron saint of Álava in the mid-17th century. Prudencio is believed to have been born in Armentia and died in El Burgo de Osma, Soria on 28 April; the year is unknown.

Life

Prudencio was born and raised in Armentia, a small village which is now within the municipality of Vitoria-Gasteiz. When he was 15, he became an anchorite and moved to Soria under the tutelage of Saturio. Prudencio remained there for at least seven years, when he removed to Calahorra. In Calahorra, he is believed to have performed miraculous cures and converted many people to Christianity. Prudencio was well-known, and was visited by many ill people. 

He moved to Tarazona as a priest, maintaining its church and becoming an archdeacon. After the death of Tarazona's bishop, Prudencio succeeded him. He went to Burgo de Osma to mediate a dispute between that diocese and its clergy, where he became ill and died.

Since Prudencio died outside his diocese, his resting place was disputed. According to legend, he was placed on his horse for the horse to determine where he would be buried. He was reportedly interred six leagues from Logroño.

Canonization and veneration

Prudencio was reportedly canonized on 24 April 759 at the monastery of San Millán de la Cogolla. On 18 November 1643, he was named the patron saint of the province of Álava.

Basilica

The Basilica of San Prudencio de Armentia is in the southern suburbs of Vitoria-Gasteiz. Built in the late 12th century and remodeled during the 18th, it was listed as a Bien de Interés Cultural on 4 June 1931. The basilica was renovated between 1773 and 1776, replacing its 12th-century façade and walls. In 1979, its name was changed from San Andrés to San Prudencio.

Festival

Álava organizes several activities for the two-day festival, which begins on 27 April. The Retreta opens the festival on the night of 27 April in the Plaza de la Diputación, where a tamborrada similar to the Tamborrada in San Sebastián takes place with trumpets, drums and Basque dance groups. According to a local newspaper, the first tamborrada connected with the San Prudencio festival was held in 1975; the festival itself has been held since at least 1964. 

The following day, a fair is held with traders and craftsmen. A popular song is sung during the festival: 

Spanish:

Suena el tun, tun y con él la trompeta,
Es la retreta de nuestro patrón. (Bis).
Los alaveses, en este día, con alegría y con buena unión.
Celebran fiestas a San Prudencio, a San Prudencio su patrón.
Suena el tun, tun y con el la trompeta,
Es la retreta de nuestro patrón. (Bis)

Basque:

Tuntunarekin turuten doinua
gure zaindariaren eguna (berriz)
Arabatarrok egun honetan,
elkartzen gara alaitasunez,
ospatutzeko Prudentzio jaia,
gure patroi handia.

San Prudencio's Zortzikoa:

Buenas tortillas de perretxikos
Con huevos frescos y buen jamón
Que son los útiles más convenientes
Para este día de animación
Arriba todos los alaveses
De alma sencilla y buen corazón
Celebren fiestas a San Prudencio
A San Prudencio que es su patrón

Gallery

Sources
  
  
 
  

Festivals in Spain